Wild Angels is the third studio album by the American country music artist Martina McBride. The album produced the singles "Safe in the Arms of Love", the title track, "Swingin' Doors", "Phones Are Ringin' All Over Town" and "Cry on the Shoulder of the Road". The title track was McBride's first number one hit on the US Billboard Hot Country Songs charts. The album was certified Platinum by the RIAA.

Also included on this album is a cover of "Two More Bottles of Wine", which was previously a #1 hit for Emmylou Harris in 1978. "Safe in the Arms of Love" was originally recorded by Wild Choir on their self-titled 1986 album, Baillie & the Boys on their 1989 album Turn the Tide, Kennedy Rose on their 1994 album Walk the Line, and Michelle Wright on her 1994 album The Reasons Why. Wright's version of the song was a Top 10 hit in Canada. "A Great Disguise" would later be recorded by Pam Tillis on her 1998 album Every Time.

Track listing

Personnel 
Compiled from liner notes.
Musicians

 Eddie Bayers - drums (tracks 2-4 & 10)
 Dennis Burnside - string arrangements (tracks 10 & 11)
 Larry Byrom - electric guitar (tracks 5 & 6)
 Joe Chemay - bass guitar (all tracks), fretless bass (track 2)
 Ashley Cleveland - backing vocals (tracks 1 & 7)
 Rusty "Pedal" Danmyer - pedal steel guitar (tracks 4 & 7)
 Dan Dugmore - electric guitar (tracks 1, 4, 7 & 9), pedal steel guitar (tracks 1 & 8), Dobro (track 11)
 Larry Franklin - fiddle (tracks 2, 5 & 9), mandolin (track 5)
 Carl Gorodetzky, Pamela Sixfin, Kristin Wilkinson, Robert Mason - strings (tracks 10 & 11)
 Vicki Hampton - backing vocals (track 1)
 Levon Helm - backing vocals (track 8)
 John Hobbs - keyboards (track 1, 2, 4 & 8-11), piano (tracks 3 & 7)
 Dann Huff - electric guitar (tracks 1-4, 7, 9 & 10)
 Mary Ann Kennedy - backing vocals (track 2)
 Larry Marrs - backing vocals (tracks 1, 8, 9 & 11)
 Martina McBride - lead vocals (all tracks), tambourine (tracks 1 & 9), backing vocals (tracks 4, 9 & 10)
 Steve Nathan - keyboards (tracks 5 & 6)
 Russ Pahl - pedal steel guitar (tracks 5 & 6)
 Pam Rose - backing vocals (tracks 2 & 10)
 Darrell Scott - mandolin (track 2)
 Eric Silver - mandolin (track 10)
 Harry Stinson - backing vocals (tracks 1, 8 & 11)
 Billy Joe Walker Jr. - acoustic guitar (tracks 2-4 & 10)
 Biff Watson - acoustic guitar (tracks 1, 5-9 & 11)
 Charlie Whitten - pedal steel guitar (track 3)
 Dennis Wilson - backing vocals (tracks 3-5)
 Lonnie Wilson - drums (tracks 1 & 5-9)
 Paul Worley - acoustic guitar (tracks 1, 3-5 & 7-11), high-strung guitar (track 2), electric guitar (tracks 4, 11), six-string bass (track 4)
 Curtis Young - backing vocals (tracks 3-5)

Production
 Jim Burnett - digital editor
 Pete Green - overdubbing engineer
 Martina McBride - producer
 Mike Poole - overdubbing engineer
 Mike Psanos - overdubbing engineer
 Clarke Schleicher - overdubbing engineer
 Ed Seay - producer, engineer, mixing engineer, overdubbing engineer
 Paul Worley - producer

Chart performance

Album

Singles

Certifications

References

1995 albums
Martina McBride albums
RCA Records albums
Albums produced by Paul Worley